Uma Ukpai (born January 7, 1945) is a Christian leader, an international evangelist, and preacher from Nigeria.
 He is the founder and president of Uma Ukpai Evangelistic Association (UUEA), a non-denominational gospel ministry based in Uyo, Akwa Ibom State, Nigeria. He is also a key leader of Pentecostal Fellowship of Nigeria, PFN, being a founder of the movement.

'

Early life
An Igbo from Asaga in Ohafia, Abia State, Uma Ukpai converted to Christianity in 1958. He lost his father to death at the age of 10. Uma Ukpai describing how his early life challenges nearly impaired his career development remarked “I know what it means to lose a father and be a father from that age. I know what it is to save money to pay school fees. So, I have feelings for the poor. I learnt early enough to know that the stone Satan throws at you can become a stepping stone.”

Education and Qualification
He attended Uma Ukpai Memorial Primary School, Asaga, and Khana County Council School, Ogoni. Uma passed through All Saints Secondary School, Aba, and Niger Delta Technical School, now Boys Technical College, Aba. Uma Ukpai graduated from the School of Journalism and Television, Frisham, Hermitage, United Kingdom; South Florida Christian College Miami, Florida, USA; Carolina Christian University and Burke Bible College, Kentucky, USA. He holds a Certificate in Electrical Engineering Practice, a Diploma in Journalism, a Bachelor and Doctorate Degrees in Divinity.

Family
Uma is married to Philomena Uma Ukpai, a pastor. Their marriage produced 8 children and an adopted child. Uma Ukpai lost 2 of his children in a car accident on the same day.

Ministry
Uma Ukpai is called to build bridges between different denominations through his evangelistic, prophetic and crusade ministry. For more than 30 years, the ministry has run a medical outreach whilst doing the work of God. Uma Ukpai Evangelistic Association, UUEA, is one of the financiers of Pentecostal Fellowship of Nigeria, (PFN).

Crusades
Uma Ukpai has held many citywide crusades all over Nigeria. At present he holds a yearly crusade, Greater Ohafia For Christ Crusade, and in collaboration with Dr Celestine Iwendi - a lecturer and the Pastor in charge at The Comfort Zone Ministries, Uma holds Anioma One-million Man Crusade, 2016, Nsukka 2012, and Greater Ibadan for Christ 1982.< It was his Greater Lagos for Christ Crusade of 1985 that gave birth to the Pentecostal Fellowship of Nigeria (PFN).

Medical Outreach
Uma Ukpai is the chairman of Uma Ukpai Eye Centre, and King of Kings Hospital, a specialist hospital in Abia State, that services communities in Abia, Akwa Ibom and Cross River States.

Academic Institutions
He is the proprietor of Uma Ukpai School of Theology and Biblical Studies, Uyo, Uma Ukpai Polytechnic Asaga, Uma Ukpai Scholarship Foundation and Joseph business school, affiliate of Joseph business school Chicago, USA.

References

External links

Living people
Nigerian religious leaders
Nigerian Christians
Pentecostal writers
20th-century Protestants
21st-century Protestants
1945 births
People from Abia State